Woustviller is a commune in the Moselle department in Grand Est in north-eastern France.

Population

Twin towns
 Wustweiler (Germany), since 1996.

See also
 Communes of the Moselle department

References

External links
 

Communes of Moselle (department)
Moselle communes articles needing translation from French Wikipedia